Nu Beta Epsilon is a professional law fraternity .

History
The fraternity is the result of a merger between two substantially identical groups: Nu Beta Epsilon, founded in 1919 at Northwestern University School of Law and Alpha Kappa Sigma (ΑΚΣ) found at University of Maryland Law School in 1918. Representatives of the two Fraternities met at Columbus, Ohio in 1939 and the merger was effected in 1940 with the name, motto and seal of the old Nu Beta Epsilon group.

Membership Characteristics
Nu Beta Epsilon was founded as a non-sectarian and did not have any racial membership limitations. Nu Beta Epsilon is considered Historically Jewish. Membership became open to women some time after the merger of the two groups.

Traditions and Insignia

Chapter List
The chapters of Nu Beta Epsilon:

 Alpha - University of Maryland Law School - 1918
 Brandeis - Northwestern University Law School - 1919 (Inactive prior to 1963)
 Delta - Temple University Law School - 1919 (Inactive prior to 1963)
 Epsilon - Newark Law School -1919 (Inactive prior to 1963)
 Cardozo - DePaul University College of Law - 1923
 Benjamin - Chicago-Kent College of Law - 1924 (namesake Judah P. Benjamin)
 Marshall - Washington University School of Law - 1926 
 Chicago - University of Chicago Law School - 1929 (Inactive prior to 1963)
 Horner - University of Illinois Law School - 1921
 Beta Gamma -George Washington University Law School and Georgetown University Law School -1931
 Loyola - Loyola University Chicago School of Law - 1932 (Inactive prior to 1963)
 Zeta - Atlanta Law School, Emory University Law School, Atlanta's John Marshall Law School -1933
 Coleman - University of Southern California Law School -1941
 Theta - University of Miami School of Law -1946
 Currie - UCLA School of Law - 1950

Notable members
Harold Washington - Mayor of Chicago and Congressman from Illinois 1st District
John M. Slaton - 60th Governor of Georgia (Honorary in 1942)
Bernard B. Wolfe - American politician in the state of Illinois.
Phillip C. Goldstick - American politician in the state of Illinois.

See also 
 Order of the Coif (honor society, law)
 The Order of Barristers (honor society, law; litigation)
 Phi Delta Phi (honor society, law; was a professional fraternity)
 Alpha Phi Sigma (honor society, criminal justice)
 Lambda Epsilon Chi (honor society, paralegal)

 Delta Theta Phi (professional fraternity, law)
 Gamma Eta Gamma (professional fraternity, law)
 Phi Alpha Delta (professional fraternity, law)
 Phi Beta Gamma (professional fraternity, law)
 Phi Delta Delta (professional fraternity, women, law)
 Sigma Delta Kappa (professional fraternity, law
 Kappa Alpha Pi (professional) (professional fraternity, pre-law)
 Kappa Beta Pi (originally women's professional fraternity, now legal association, law)

References

Student organizations established in 1919
Professional legal fraternities and sororities in the United States
1919 establishments in Illinois
Historically Jewish fraternities in the United States